The Gagauz Republic (Respublika Gagauzija) was an unrecognised state that separated from Moldova during the dissolution of the Soviet Union but later peacefully joined  Moldova after being de facto independent from 1990 to 1994.

History 

The Special Congress of Representatives of the Gagauz people was held on 12 November 1989, in which the Gagauz Republic was proclaimed in the Moldavian SSR, but on the next day the Presidium of the Supreme Council of Moldavia abolished the Special Congress decisions, calling them unconstitutional.

The Congress of People's Deputies of the Steppe South of the Moldavian SSR declared independence from the Moldavian SSR and the establishment of the Gagauz Republic on 19 August 1990. Two days later, the Presidium of the Supreme Council of the Moldavian SSR held an emergency meeting, and a decision was reached to declare the republic illegal and the congress unconstitutional. A detachment of Moldovan volunteers and police units were sent to Gagauzia to quell the dissidence, but the arrival of SSV soldiers prevented bloodshed.

In December 1994, on the basis of agreements reached by the Gagauz Republic and the Republic of Moldova, a document on the peaceful integration of Gagauzia with autonomous rights was signed. The integration was carried out from December 1994 to June 1995, when the Gagauz Republic legally dissolved and became the Autonomous Territorial Unit of Gagauzia.

Armed forces 

As the Gagauzia conflict was developing and tensions between the Gagauz and the central government in Chișinău remained high, the Gagauz localities started establishing paramilitary structures for their self-defense. The most prominent one was the Budjak Battalion, led by the Gagauz nationalist and politician .

See also 

 Gagauzia
 Gagauz people
 List of Chairmen of the Gagauzian People's Assembly
 Comrat Republic
 Transnistria

References 

Gagauzia conflict
History of Gagauzia
Post-Soviet states
Separatism in Moldova
Regions of Europe with multiple official languages
States and territories disestablished in 1994
States and territories established in 1990
Former republics
Former unrecognized countries
1990 establishments in the Moldavian Soviet Socialist Republic
1994 disestablishments in Moldova